Jan-Niclas Gesenhues (born 12 February 1990) is a German economist and politician of the Alliance 90/The Greens who has been serving as a member of the Bundestag since the 2021 elections.

Political career
Gesenhues has been a member of the Bundestag since 2021, representing the Steinfurt III district. In parliament, he has since been serving on the  Committee on the Environment, Nature Conservation, Nuclear Safety and Consumer Protection and the Committee on Economic Cooperation and Development.

In the negotiations to form a coalition government of the Christian Democratic Union (CDU) and the Green Party under Minister-President of North Rhine-Westphalia Hendrik Wüst following the 2022 state elections, Gesenhues and Norwich Rüße led their party's delegation in the working group on the environment, agriculture and consumer protection; their counterparts from the CDU were Peter Liese and Patricia Peill.

Other activities
 German Institute for Development Evaluation (DEval), Member of the advisory board (since 2022)

References

External links 
 

Living people
1990 births
Politicians from Karlsruhe
21st-century German politicians
Members of the Bundestag for Alliance 90/The Greens
Members of the Bundestag 2021–2025